The Pointe du Mountet is a mountain of the Swiss Pennine Alps, situated west of Zermatt in Valais. It is located south of the Zinalrothorn.

References

External links
Pointe du Mountet on Hikr

Mountains of the Alps
Alpine three-thousanders
Mountains of Switzerland
Mountains of Valais
Three-thousanders of Switzerland